Seltenbach may refer to the following streams or rivers in Germany:

 Seltenbach (Eisbach), tributary of the River Eisbach in Ebertsheim, county of Bad Dürkheim, Rhineland-Palatinate
 Seltenbach (Main), tributary of the River Main, in Klingenberg am Main, county of Miltenberg, Bavaria
 Seltenbach (Neckar), tributary of the River Neckar, near Obernau, town of Rottenburg am Neckar, county of Tübingen, Baden-Württemberg